Project KickStart is desktop project management software by Experience in Software, Inc. in Berkeley, California. The program uses a wizard-like interface for project planning.

History 

The original Project KickStart for DOS was released in 1992. The product far outsold Experience in Software's other titles, and in 1995 Project KickStart for Windows was released. Versions 2, 3, 4 and 5 (all for Windows) followed. Since 2008, the company sells Project KickStart Standard 5 and Project KickStart Pro 5.

Software 

Project KickStart's wizard prompts users to identify phases, goals, obstacles and personnel assignments for projects and uses a calendar to produce a Gantt chart that features the project's phases and the goals, tasks and assignments for each.

KickStart's project files can be exported into Microsoft's Project, Outlook, Word, Excel or PowerPoint, as well as ACT!, Milestones Professional, MindManager and WBS Chart.

References

External links 
 Official Website

Project management software
1992 software
Projects established in 1992